Strunzite (Mn2+Fe3+2(PO4)2(OH)26H2O) is a light yellow mineral of the strunzite group, first discovered in 1957.

It crystallizes in the triclinic system and has a light, vitreous luster, a specific gravity of 2.52 and a Mohs hardness of 4. Associated minerals include beraunite, quartz and strengite.

It is named after Hugo Strunz, a Professor of Mineralogy at Technical University, Berlin.

References

Manganese minerals
Iron(II,III) minerals
Phosphate minerals
Oxide minerals
Triclinic minerals
Minerals in space group 2